Aker ASA is a Norwegian industrial investment company with ownership interests concentrated in oil and gas, renewable energy and green technologies,  industrial software, seafood and marine biotechnology sectors. The company is listed on Oslo Stock Exchange. Aker's main shareholder is Kjell Inge Røkke, who owns 68.2% per cent of Aker through his company TRG Holding AS. The corporate headquarters are located in Fornebu, Norway. Aker was established in 1841 when Akers Mekaniske Verksted was founded in Oslo.

Group companies
As of 31 December 2022, Aker's industrial holdings include: 

Currently owned
Aker BP
Aker Solutions
Aker Energy
Aker Horizons
Aker BioMarine
Cognite
Salmar Aker Ocean
Aize

History
The company takes its name from the former Akers mekaniske Verksted, which was Norway's largest shipyard and which closed in 1982. In 1987 one of the surviving companies split off from the shipyard merged with Norcem, creating a large cement group in Norway with focus on the offshore industry. The cement business was sold in 1999.

Kjell Inge Røkke used his investment company Resource Group International to purchase large amounts of Aker shares, and merged the two companies in 1996 to form Aker RGI. Through the listed partial subsidiary, Aker Maritime, Aker acquired its competitor, the offshore engineering and construction company Kværner, in 2000 and merged Aker Maritime and Kværner into Aker Kværner. Kværner had been through major economical trouble due to a bad market in the late 1990s because of the low oil price and the failed purchase of the British company Trafalgar House. After the merger the holding company changed its name back to just Aker.

In 1999, after clearing European anti-monopoly concerns, Aker and Apax Partners merged their warehouse technologies and material handling units to form the Dexion Group Ltd (Apax) and Constructor AS (Aker); in 2000, the Dexion Group was acquired by Aker and merged with Constructor, while the Australia/Asia Pacific operations were sold. In 2007, as part of the Aker Material Handling group of companies, Constructor/Dexion was sold to the Swedish finance investor Altor Equity Partners.

References

 01
Conglomerate companies of Norway
Holding companies of Norway
Shipbuilding companies of Norway
Conglomerate companies established in 2004
Holding companies established in 2004
Manufacturing companies established in 2004
Norwegian companies established in 2004
Companies listed on the Oslo Stock Exchange